Arnold Hague (December 3, 1840 in Boston, Massachusetts – May 14, 1917 in Washington, D.C.) was a United States geologist who did many geological surveys in the U.S., of which the best known was that for Yellowstone National Park. He also had assignments in China and Guatemala. He became a member of the U. S. Geological Survey in 1879 when it was first organized.

Biography
Hague was the son of William Hague, a clergyman. He graduated from Sheffield Scientific School at Yale University in 1863. He then spent three years in Germany, studying at the universities of Göttingen and Heidelberg, and at the Freiberg Mining Academy.

In 1867 he returned to the United States, and was appointed assistant geologist on the U. S. geological exploration of the 40th parallel under Clarence King. He then went to California, and spent the winter of 1867/68 in Virginia City, Nevada, studying the surface geology of the Comstock Lode and the chemistry of the amalgamation process as practised there, and known as the “Washoe process”. The results of this study were published in volume iii. of the report of the exploration, under the title of “Chemistry of the Washoe Process.” He also contributed to the same volume a chapter on the geology of the White Pine mining district, in which there was first brought to notice the great development of Devonian rocks in the Great Basin of Utah and Nevada. In volume ii. — “Descriptive Geology” — of the report of the exploration, which was the joint work of Hague and Samuel F. Emmons, there is given the results of a detailed geological survey across the Cordilleras of North America, from the Great Plains to the Sierra Nevada range in California. This work included a geological atlas of maps and sections, which was completed after a great deal of hardship, the map of the Great Basin being accomplished before the completion of either the Union or Central Pacific Railroad.

On the termination of this work in 1877, he received the appointment of government geologist of Guatemala, and traveled extensively over the republic, visiting the principal mining regions and the centres of volcanic activity. In 1878 he was engaged by the Chinese government to examine gold, silver, and lead mines in northern China. 

On the organization of the U. S. Geological Survey in 1879, he returned to the United States, and became one of its geologists. He was sent to Nevada, and made a report on the “Geology of the Eureka District.” In 1883 he was made geologist of the Yellowstone Park division, and assigned to the study of the geysers of that district in connection with the extinct volcanic regions of the Rocky Mountains. 

He was a member of scientific societies both in the United States and Europe and in 1885 was elected to the National Academy of Sciences. He received an Sc.D. degree from Columbia University in 1901, and an LL.D. degree from Aberdeen University. 

He was a member of the commission appointed by the National Academy of Sciences at the request of the United States Government in 1896 to prepare plans for the National Forest preserves. He was vice president of the International Congresses of Geologists held in Paris in 1900, in Stockholm in 1910 and in Toronto in 1913. He became president of the Geological Society of America in 1910.

Works
He made numerous contributions to scientific journals, on lithology and geology, and was the principal author of the following memoirs:

 The Volcanoes of California, Oregon, and Washington Territory (1883)
 The Volcanic Rocks of the Great Basin (1884)
 On the Development of Crystallization in the Igneous Rocks of Washoe (1885)
 Nevada, with Notes on the Geology of the District (1885)
 The Volcanic Rocks of Salvador (1886)
 Geological History of the Yellowstone National Park (1888)

Notes

References

 New York Times obituary

External links

 
 
 
 National Academy of Sciences Biographical Memoir

1840 births
1917 deaths
American geologists
Yale University alumni
University of Göttingen alumni
Heidelberg University alumni
Members of the United States National Academy of Sciences
Members of the American Philosophical Society
American expatriates in Guatemala
American expatriates in China
Presidents of the Geological Society of America